The Merchant Shipping Act 1995 is an Act of Parliament passed in the United Kingdom in 1995. It consolidated much of the UK's maritime legislation, repealing several Acts in their entirety and provisions in many more, some dating back to the mid-nineteenth century.  It appoints several officers of Admiralty Jurisdiction such as the Receiver of Wreck.  The Act of 1995 updates the prior Merchant Shipping Act 1894.  The lead part on British ships was impacted by the outcome of the Factortame case, as the Merchant Shipping Act 1988 was impugned by the Common Fisheries Policy.

Content of Act
The Act comprises 316 sections divided into 13 Parts:
 Part I: British ships
 Part II: Registration
 Part III: Masters and Seamen
 Part IV: Safety
 Part V: Fishing Vessels
 Part VI: Prevention of Pollution
 Part VII: Liability of Shipowners and Others
 Part VIII: Lighthouses
 Part IX: Salvage and Wreck
 Part X: Enforcement Officers and Powers
 Part XI: Accident Investigations and Inquiries
 Part XII: Legal Proceeding
 Part XIII: Supplemental

Part VIII: Lighthouses
Part VIII of the Act provides the powers and duties of the general lighthouse authorities and local lighthouse authorities.

Part IX: Salvage and Wreck
Receiver of Wreck is a post defined in Part IX of the Act. It is an official of the British government whose main task is to process incoming reports of shipwrecks in order to give legitimate owners the opportunity to retrieve their property and ensure that law-abiding finders of wreck receive an appropriate reward. According to the Act, a wreck falls into one of four categories:
 Flotsam  goods lost from a ship which has sunk or otherwise perished which are recoverable because they have floated.
 Jetsam  goods cast overboard (jettisoned) in order to lighten a vessel which is in danger of sinking, even if they ultimately perish.
 Derelict  property which has been abandoned and deserted at sea by those who were in charge without any hope of recovering it. This includes vessels and cargo.
 Lagan (or ligan)  goods cast overboard from a ship, which afterwards perish, buoyed so that they can be recovered later.

Part XI: Accident Investigations and Inquiries
Part XI of the Act provides the powers and duties of the Marine Accident Investigation Branch.

Subsequent amendments
The Merchant Shipping (Pollution) Act 2006 amended section 178(1) of the Act. It restricts claims to being enforced within three years of the damage occurring, whereas previously it had been restricted to within three years after "the claim against the Fund arose", and within six years of the damage occurring.

The Marine Navigation Act 2013 made four changes to the Act: 
 Section 47 was amended so that regulations relating to manning requirements on ships may refer to information contained in other documents.
 Section 193 was amended to specify the area of sea in which each Authority may operate.
 Section 197 was amended and section 197A added to enable the general lighthouse authorities to enter into a broader range of commercial agreements. The income from these agreements will supplement revenue from light dues, used to fund the work of the Authorities. 
 Section 252 was amended to enable lighthouse authorities to mark wrecks by electronic methods as well as physical aids to navigation.

See also
Merchant Shipping Act
Merchant Shipping Act 1894
Merchant Shipping Act 1786
R (Factortame Ltd) v Secretary of State for Transport

References

External links

United Kingdom Acts of Parliament 1995
Admiralty law in the United Kingdom
Fisheries law
Shipping in the United Kingdom